Tidra is an offshore island  long and  wide. It is the largest island off the shore of Banc d' Arguin, Mauritania (also being the largest in the nation) and is home to a community of Imraguen fishing tribe. The island is part of the Banc d'Arguin National Park.

Nearby islands and islets include Nair to the north, Cheddid to the southwest and Kijji to the west, the peninsula (then island) of Serenni lies to the east together with mainland Mauritania roughly 2 to 3 km, nearby towns across in the mainland includes Iwik to the northeast and Tessot to the east.

During the prehistoric era, Tidra was once connected to the mainland until some 6,000 to 5,000 years ago when the rise of the sea level split it from the mainland.

Abdallah ibn Yasin founded a ribat (military refuge) in 1035, which was the origin of the Almoravid Dynasty.

References

External links
 Watching the Birds, Banc De´Arguin National Park, Mauritania

Islands of Mauritania
Dakhlet Nouadhibou Region